The Union of Libertarian Communist Workers (UTCL) was a political organization established in France and created in 1978 after splitting from the Revolutionary Anarchist Organization two years earlier. It was active until 1991, when Alternative libertaire was created.

History
Following the 1974 strikes in the banks, the PTT and the railways, a revolutionary syndicalist tendency was formed within the Revolutionary Anarchist Organization (ORA), called the Union of Libertarian Communist Workers (UTCL).

The UTCL trend reproached the ORA for its leftist and anti-syndicalist drift which kept it away from workplace activism. The UTCL wanted to re-anchor anarchism in the workers' movement and in syndicalism. At its April 1976 congress in Orleans, the ORA excluded the UTCL tendency, and renamed itself the Libertarian Communist Organization (OCL). In February 1978 the founding congress of the UTCL was held. The organization was then organized into sector by profession (rail, banking, metallurgy, education, etc.

In 1979, the UTCL received the adhesion of Georges Fontenis and Daniel Guérin.

In 1980, UTCL merged with the Anarchist Combat Organization (OCA).

In 1986, during the protests against Alain Devaquet, the Young Libertarian Collective (CJL) was born, which soon joined the UTCL.

During the 1980s, UTCL activists found themselves at the helm of several left-wing CFDT unions, opposed to the “refocusing” of the confederation.

In 1986, the UTCL railway workers, including Henri Célié and Christian Mahieux, played an important role in triggering the winter strikes at the SNCF, which for the first time saw the appearance of coordinating strikers. In 1987, it was still activists from the UTCL who participated in the start of the teachers' strike. In 1988, one found them in the strikes of the Post office which led to the exclusion of several combative CFDT unions, and to the birth of SUD-PTT. In 1989, the UTCL militants of the aviation sector were present in the violent strike of Air France.

The UTCL was for 15 years one of the far-left organizations most at the forefront in the emergence of alternative trade unionism which was to result, after the refocusing of the CFDT, in the creation of new radical unions (SLT in Usinor- Dunkirk, SNPIT at Air Inter, CRC in health, SUD at PTT, etc.).

In 1991, the UTCL and the CJL dissolved themselves, and their activists join Alternative libertaire.

References

Bibliography

1978 establishments in France
1991 disestablishments in France
Defunct anarchist organizations in France
Organizations established in 1978
Organizations disestablished in 1991
Syndicalist trade unions